Bullis is an Indomalayan genus of butterflies in the family Lycaenidae.

Species
Bullis elioti (Corbet, 1940) Peninsular Malaya and Borneo
Bullis buto (de Nicéville, 1895) - baby royal
Bullis stigmata (Druce, 1904) Peninsular Malaya, Borneo, Sumatra, Singapore, Thailand

References

Iolaini
Lycaenidae genera
Taxa named by Lionel de Nicéville